The Sacramento Metropolitan Cable Television Commission is the joint powers agency responsible for regulating the cable television franchises and licenses in Sacramento County, California. The Commission's Board of Directors is composed of members of the constituent jurisdictions: Sacramento County, Sacramento, Citrus Heights, Elk Grove, Rancho Cordova, Folsom, and Galt.

Formal responsibilities
The Commission is responsible for:
 Administering the cable television franchises and licenses in Sacramento County
 Assisting consumers in resolving their cable and non-cable video concerns
 Monitoring community programming and grantee funding
 Operating the local Government-access television (GATV) cable TV channel, Metro Cable

Franchises
The Commission currently licenses four cable television providers:
 Comcast throughout Sacramento County
 Frontier Communications in Elk Grove
 Strategic Technologies in Natomas
 SureWest in Natomas, Arden, Carmichael, Fair Oaks, Sacramento, Citrus Heights, Oak Park, Antelope, Elk Grove, and LandPark.

Late fees case
On March 23, 1993, Sacramento Cable instituted a $5 late fee on cable bills. These fees soon became the most common subject of complaint received by the Commission.

On July 25, 1994 a major class action suit (Selnick v. Sacramento Cable) was initiated over the legality of these late fees, which it was contended violated California law. This suit grew out of the Commission's investigation into the issue. The case was settled, and new legislation on late fees was drafted.

Notes

External links
 Official website Metro Cable
 Access Sacramento audio 
 Sacramento Educational Consortium
 About Sacramento Educational Cable Consortium
 KVIE Cable 7
 Capital Public Radio
 CA State Senate floor report on late fees legislation 
 this Multichannel news story that discusses action by the commission on possible content restriction. of cable programming

Metropolitan Cable Television Commission
Metropolitan Cable Television Commission
Special districts of California